The fourth railway package is a set of changes to rail transport regulation in the European Union law.  It covers standards and authorisation for rolling stock; workforce skills; independent management of infrastructure; and the liberalisation of domestic passenger services in an attempt to reduce European rail subsidies.

Background
The fourth railway package attempts to reform railways companies (whether private or public) that are able to raise prices if they dominate both tracks and the trains. Because of scepticism in most countries about the value of liberalisation, the package permits tracks and trains to be owned by a single holding company. The "compliance verification clause" could allow regulators to place sanctions on parts of a vertically integrated rail business which place obstacles in the way of competitors trying to provide services on their network; this would improve competition.

Responsibility for authorising rolling stock to use a network would be shifted away from network owners and towards the European Railway Agency. This is expected to be faster and cheaper. 

In 2015, the technical and political pillars of the package were accepted by EU transport ministers and currently the European Commission, Parliament and Council are negotiating to reach an agreement on the text of the regulations. The technical pillar of the fourth railway package has been adopted by the European Commission and approved by the European Parliament in April 2016.

Legislation
Regulation (EU) 2016/796 of the European Parliament and of the Council of 11 May 2016 on the European Union Agency for Railways and repealing Regulation (EC) No 881/2004
Directive (EU) 2016/797 of the European Parliament and of the Council of 11 May 2016 on the interoperability of the rail system within the European Union
Directive (EU) 2016/798 of the European Parliament and of the Council of 11 May 2016 on railway safety
Regulation (EU) 2016/2337 of the European Parliament and of the Council of 14 December 2016 repealing Regulation (EEC) No 1192/69 of the Council on common rules for the normalisation of the accounts of railway undertakings
Regulation (EU) 2016/2338 of the European Parliament and of the Council of 14 December 2016 amending Regulation (EC) No 1370/2007 concerning the opening of the market for domestic passenger transport services by rail
Directive (EU) 2016/2370 of the European Parliament and of the Council of 14 December 2016 amending Directive 2012/34/EU as regards the opening of the market for domestic passenger transport services by rail and the governance of the railway infrastructure

See also
UK enterprise law
ERTMS - A pan-European signalling system being promoted by the EU.
Single European Railway Directive 2012 (or the First Railway Package)
European Railway Agency
Rail transport in Europe
Second railway package
Third railway package

Notes

Transport and the European Union
Rail transport in Europe
European Union regulations
2013 in law
2013 in rail transport
International rail transport
Railway04